Márcio Carvalho Jorge (born 28 January 1975 in Colina, São Paulo, Brazil) is a Brazilian Olympic eventing rider. He competed at two Summer Olympics (in 2012 and 2016). He finished 7th in team eventing in 2016. Meanwhile, his best individual Olympic placement is 25th place from the same Games.

Jorge also participated at two Pan American Games (in 2011 and 2015). He won a team silver in 2015 and a team bronze in 2011.

And he also participated at two Badminton in 2014 he came 23rd with Josephine MCJ.
Badminton in 2017 he came 30th with Lissy Mac Wayer.

Jorge participated in two World Games ( in 1998 and 2018 ) 
1998 Rome WEG he came 9th with Arabesco.
2018 Tryon USA WEG he came 32nd with Coronel MCJ.

Notable Horses 

 Josephine MCJ – 2003 Bay Brazilian Horse Mare (Potassium XX x El Bacancito)
 2011 Pan American Games – Team Bronze Medal, Individual Ninth Place
 2012 London Olympics – Team Ninth Place, Individual 46th Place
 Lissy Mac Wayer – 2003 Seal Brown Westfalen Mare (Laomedon x Pik Labionics)
 2015 Pan American Games – Team Silver Medal, Individual Ninth Place
 2016 Rio Olympics – Team Seventh Place, Individual 25th Place
 Capri HCR – 2007 Chestnut Brazilian Horse Mare (Chester Z x Be My Chief XX)
 2017 FEI Eventing Young Horse World Championships – 28th Place

References

,

Brazilian male equestrians
1975 births
Living people
Olympic equestrians of Brazil
Equestrians at the 2012 Summer Olympics
Equestrians at the 2016 Summer Olympics
Equestrians at the 2011 Pan American Games
Equestrians at the 2015 Pan American Games
Pan American Games silver medalists for Brazil
Pan American Games bronze medalists for Brazil
Pan American Games medalists in equestrian
Medalists at the 2015 Pan American Games
Medalists at the 2011 Pan American Games
20th-century Brazilian people
21st-century Brazilian people
People from Colina, São Paulo